XHEPO-FM is a radio station  located in the city of San Luis Potosí, San Luis Potosí, Mexico. It rebroadcasts the programming of XEDA-FM Imagen Radio 90.5 FM from Mexico City.

History
XEPO-AM on 1310 kHz received its concession on September 2, 1947. It was owned by Radio Ondas Populares, S.A., and broadcast with 1,000 watts. By the 1980s, however, it had gone to 500 watts.

In 1987, XEPO moved to 1100 kHz and began broadcasting with 1,000 watts again. The same year, it was sold to Grupo ACIR, with the concession being transferred to Radio Integral in 2000. Formats under ACIR included Radio Voz, Radio ACIR, Bonita and Inolvidable.

In 2005, ACIR sold XEPO to Controladora de Medios (now known as GlobalMedia), with the station taking on its Imagen Radio affiliation; Cable Master became the concessionaire in 2006. In 2010, XEPO moved to FM as XHEPO-FM 103.1; 1100 AM signed off for the final time in January 2015.

References

Radio stations in San Luis Potosí
Mass media in San Luis Potosí City
Radio stations established in 1947
1947 establishments in Mexico